Delta Epsilon Mu, Incorporated is a co-ed fraternity in the United States for students and professionals in clinical or applied practice with interests or focus in pre-health or health-related fields.

It has active chapters in New York, California, Maryland, Florida, Virginia, Washington DC, Kansas, Texas, Ohio, Illinois, Michigan, Rhode Island, Washington, Pennsylvania, and New Jersey.

Purpose 
The Members of Delta Epsilon Mu serve the community by advocating health education and care, and through active participation in service activities, fundraising, and outreach programs. Members are given the opportunity to directly participate in health-oriented workshops and discussions, thereby attaining access to pertinent academic and career information through association with professors, advisors, career professionals, Alumni Members and fellow Active Members.

History 
As a late twentieth-century Greek organization, Delta Epsilon Mu was founded in a comparably more modern setting than its counterparts recognized within the Professional Fraternity Association. It has a comparably short history as a professional fraternity. Delta Epsilon Mu is a young organization that is helping steer a new course for professional fraternities nationally.

Founding Charter 
Delta Epsilon Mu was formally established at Binghamton University, State University of New York, on May 3, 1996. In an effort to unite students interested in entering various pre-health professions, the Founders formed the organization for the benefit of its Members and all pre-health students on the campus.

In the fall of 1995, Marianna Strakhan and Teri Broklawski combined their efforts with Debbie Amster and Ellen Hoffman to begin the formation of a pre-health fraternity. Broklawski recruited Sherine Banton, Wendy Cooper, Wendy Goldstein, and Keri Weintraub to help solidify the foundations for the fraternity. The eight students presented the Student Association of Binghamton University (SABU) with one-hundred student signatures in support of the formal establishment. In January 1996, the SABU formally recognized the fraternity as a student organization. In February 1996, the students hosted the first formal recruitment attended by eighty-six students interested in affiliation, and of these individuals, thirty-six students of various pre-health interests were chosen to become the Founders of Delta Epsilon Mu. National Founders' Day is recognized on May 3 annually, in commemoration of the date the first ratification documents for the fraternity were signed.

The Alpha chapter at Binghamton University was inactivated in 2020 after a university investigation and concurrent fraternal investigation was conducted regarding multiple corroborating reports of multiple instances of interpersonal harm, sexual assault, sexual harassment, gaslighting, and evidenced hazing. In a joint decision made by the university and fraternity leadership, the charter was revoked for this chapter, effectively disaffiliating all current undergraduate members. Though potential reinstatement can be considered as early as 2023, there is no intention to pursue this reinstatement, indefinitely.

First Board of Directors 
Though the Founders had no expectations of the future growth of the organization, word of the fraternity's establishment met the ears of students at the University of California, Davis, which eventually earned an Active Charter as the Beta chapter in 2003, thus marking the continental footprint of the organization. From 2003 to 2009, Active Charters were issued to the University of Maryland at College Park, the University of Central Florida, the Virginia Commonwealth University, and the University of California, Merced. In 2010, the Presidents of each chapter came together to draft the first plans for the integration of the chapter-based efforts and potential formalization of national leadership. Through these discussions, the first National Board of Directors was informally established.

Formalization of the Board 
In 2012, the addition of Active Charters at the George Washington University and University of Kansas warranted the need for a more formal national leadership model. Over multiple meetings, the representatives of each chapter came together to formally draft the first National Bylaws, thus establishing the first national leadership model for the organization at-large. An interim National Executive Committee was elected as product of the National Bylaws, to serve as the leader who would eventually schedule and host the first National Convention at the University of Maryland at College Park in 2013, where the first National Bylaws were ratified. The first recognized National Executive Committee, headed by newly-elected National President John "Jake" Koster and National Vice President Bradley Dmuchowski, brought on a new vision for continued growth and establishment of infrastructure.

Expansion, Recruitment, and Incorporation 
In 2014, then newly-elected Vice President of Membership Randell Rueda (current 2019-2021 National President) brought about the next layer of infrastructure for the national fraternity through the formal establishment of the expansion protocol, and subsequently the recruitment protocol, of the organization. This standardization came at a crucial time in the organization's history as concurrently, the finalization of the Articles of Incorporation was completed in 2014 in Virginia, thus transitioning the organization from a limited liability company to an incorporated entity. In 2015, the national fraternity was officially recognized as tax-exempt under the Internal Revenue Code Section 501(c)(3) as a non-profit corporation. Delta Epsilon Mu Incorporated has remained as a 501(c)(3) non-profit corporation in alignment with its mission and functions.

National Restructuring 
In 2016, the National Board of Directors pushed forward with restructuring the current composition of the National Executive Committee, establishing the National Directorship, drafting the Policy Procedure Manual to supplement the National Bylaws, and incorporating other integral changes to the national structure. With the anticipated growth of the organization over the coming years, National President Gabrielle Marie (2017-2019) and National President Randell Rueda (2019-2021) have led additional restructuring for potential staged incorporation over the coming years.

National Leadership 
Delta Epsilon Mu maintains a National Board of Directors, with a National President and seven National Vice Presidents. It also has fifteen National Directors and a National Membership Council. The National Board of Directors meets monthly and holds National Convention annually. Details and contact information of the National Directors are located on the national website.

National Executive Committee

Regions, Districts, Chapters, and Colonies 
Delta Epsilon Mu has active charters at 33 four-year collegiate institutions and inactive charters at 4 four-year collegiate institutions in four regions.

Regions

Regions and districts

Chapters

See also
 Professional fraternities and sororities

References

Student organizations established in 1996
1996 establishments in New York (state)
Professional fraternities and sororities in the United States
Professional Fraternity Association